The 2016 Open Sopra Steria de Lyon was a professional tennis tournament played on clay courts. It was the 1st edition of the tournament which was part of the 2016 ATP Challenger Tour. It took place in Lyon, France, between 6 and 12 June 2016.

Singles main-draw entrants

Seeds

 1 Rankings are as of May 30, 2016.

Other entrants
The following players received wildcards into the singles main draw:
  Julien Benneteau
  Maxime Chazal
  Corentin Denolly
  Laurent Lokoli

The following players received entry from the qualifying draw:
  Jonathan Eysseric
  Joris De Loore
  Yann Marti
  James McGee

The following players received entry as lucky losers:
  Clement Geens
  Maxime Teixeira

Champions

Singles

 Steve Darcis def.  Thiago Monteiro 3–6, 6–2, 6–0.

Doubles

 Grégoire Barrère /  Tristan Lamasine def.  Jonathan Eysseric /  Franko Škugor 2–6, 6–3, [10–6].

External links
Official Website

Open Sopra Steria de Lyon
Open Sopra Steria de Lyon
2016 in French tennis